Julia Borisenko (4 March 1990 – 23 July 2018) was a Belarusian women's association football defender.

Death
Borisenko died on 23 July 2018. Initial reports say that she drowned.

Honours 
Zorka-BDU
Winner
 Belarusian Women's Cup: 2010
 Belarusian Women's Super Cup: 2010

Ryazan
Winner
 Russian Women's Football Championship: 2013
 Russian Women's Cup: 2014

References

External links 
 

1990 births
2018 deaths
Footballers from Tallinn
Belarusian women's footballers
Expatriate women's footballers in Russia
Ryazan-VDV players
FC Minsk (women) players
Deaths by drowning
Accidental deaths in Belarus
Women's association football defenders
Belarus women's international footballers